149th Regiment Royal Armoured Corps (149 RAC) was an armoured regiment of the British Army's Royal Armoured Corps that served in the Burma Campaign during World War II.

Origin
149th Regiment RAC was formed on 22 November 1941 by the conversion to the armoured role of 7th Battalion of the King's Own Yorkshire Light Infantry (KOYLI). Raised in 1940, 7th KOYLI had been serving with 207th Independent Infantry Brigade (Home), a Home Defence formation in Essex that was broken up in August 1941 and its battalions transferred to the RAC. In common with other infantry units transferred to the Royal Armoured Corps, all personnel would have continued to wear their KOYLI cap badge on the black beret of the RAC.

Burma Campaign
7th KOYLI arrived in India on 24 October 1941, and was assigned for conversion to the Heavy Armoured Brigade, which was soon afterwards redesignated 50th Indian Tank Brigade.

149 RAC moved to the Manipur Road area in April 1944, and came under the command of 254th Indian Tank Brigade in July, when it was equipped with Grant Mk II tanks. The Brigade fought with the 5th Indian Division and the 7th Indian Infantry Divisions in Burma and was involved in the Battles at Imphal, Kohima, Kyaumaung Bridgehead, Meiktila, and Rangoon Road.

In August 1944 149 RAC returned to Bombay in India, and then in April 1945 moved to Ahmednagar where it came once again under command of 50th Indian Tank Brigade and remained in India for the remainder of the war.

149 RAC was disbanded in 1946.

Notes

References
 Forty, George. (1998). British Army Handbook 1939-1945. Stroud: Sutton Publishing. .
 
 Steven J. Zalgoa, Hugh Johnson, M3 Lee/Grant Medium Tank 1941-45.

Military units and formations established in 1941
Regiments of the Royal Armoured Corps
Royal Armoured Corps 149
Military units and formations disestablished in 1946